想 New Edition (py. Xiǎng, en. Dream), also known as 1st. Album, is an album by the Taiwanese singer, actress and model Vivian Hsu, released on October 26, 1998, on the Toshiba-EMI label. It is a re-release of her first album, 天使想 (1996) with two bonus tracks.

The bonus tracks are numbers 9 and 10, and are both originally from a single, 8月のバレンタイン ("Hachigatsu no Valentine", Engn. Valentine's Day in August), released on July 31, 1996, right after her first album.

Track listing
"くちびるの神話" – 4:51
"100カラットの涙" (Angelic Version) – 4:48
"一千一秒の秘密" (Xiang Remix) – 4:30
"忘れたい忘れたくない" – 4:53
"ついてゆきたい" – 4:18
"共犯者" – 4:38
"月影で抱きしめて" – 4:22
"海ほおずき" – 4:28
"8月のバレンタイン" – 4:46
"我愛称 [ WO AI NI ]" – 4:26

Release details

Vivian Hsu albums
1998 albums